The 1963 Tour de France was the 50th instance of that Grand Tour. Stages 2 and 6 were both two part stages, the first half being a regular stage and the second half being a team or individual time trial.

The Tour organisers were trying to break the dominance of Anquetil, who had won already three Tours, by reducing the time trials length to only , so that the climbing capabilities would be more important.

Nonetheless, the race was won by Anquetil, who was able to stay close to his main rival Federico Bahamontes in the mountains, one time even by faking a mechanical problem in order to get a bicycle that was more suited for the terrain. Bahamontes finished as the second-placed cyclist, but won the mountains classification. The points classification was won by Rik Van Looy.

Teams

The 1963 Tour started with 130 cyclists, divided into 13 teams.

The teams entering the race were:

 
 
 
 
 
 
 
 
 
 –

Pre-race favourites

The main favourite before the race was Jacques Anquetil, at that moment already a three-time winner of the Tour, including the previous two editions. Anquetil had shown good form before the Tour, as he won Paris–Nice, the Dauphiné Libéré, the Critérium National and the 1963 Vuelta a España. Anquetil was not sure if he would ride the Tour until a few days before the start; he had been infected by a tapeworm, and was advised not to start. Anquetil had chosen to ride races with tough climbs, to prepare for the 1963 Tour de France.

The major competitor was thought to be Raymond Poulidor, who had shown his capabilities in the 1962 Tour de France.

Route and stages

The 1963 Tour de France started on 23 June in Paris, and had one rest day, in Aurillac.

Race overview

In the first stage, four men escaped. One of them was Federico Bahamontes, the winner of the 1959 Tour de France. Bahamontes was known as a climber, so it was unexpected that he gained time on a flat stage. The third stage saw another successful breakaway. Seamus Elliott won the stage, and became the new leader in the race; it was the first time that an Irish cyclist led the Tour de France.

The time trial in stage 6b was won by Anquetil, with Poulidor in second place. Gilbert Desmet became the new leader. The situation did not change much in the next stages until the stages in the Pyrenees, starting with the tenth stage. Bahamontes lead the first group, but Anquetil was able to stay in that first group, which was a surprise. Anquetil stayed in that first group until the finish, where he outsprinted the rest to win his first mountain stage.
In the other two stages in the Pyrenees, Anquetil was able to stay in the first group, lost little time on his competitors, and kept getting closer to Desmet, who was still leading the general classification.

The fifteenth stage was the first in the Alps. Bahamontes won this stage, and in the general classification jumped to second place, three seconds ahead of Anquetil. In the sixteenth stage, Fernando Manzaneque won, eight minutes ahead of Bahamontes and Anquetil who stayed together. Because Desmet was further behind, Bahamontes became the new leader of the race, with a margin of three seconds on Anquetil.

The race was decided in the seventeenth stage. The rules in 1963 did not allow cyclists to change bicycles, unless there was a mechanical problem. Anquetil's team director, Raphaël Géminiani, thought that Anquetil could use a different bicycle on the ascent of the Col de la Forclaz, so he advised Anquetil to fake a mechanical problem on the start of that climb; Géminiani cut through a gear cable, and claimed that it snapped. Anquetil could thus use a light bicycle with lower gears, especially suited for a climb, which gave him an advantage on his competitors. Bahamontes reached the top of the Forclaz first, and only Anquetil had been able to follow him. After the top, Anquetil got his regular bicycle back, and rode to the finish together with Bahamontes. Anquetil won the sprint, and the bonus time made him the new leader. As expected, Anquetil won some more time in the time trial in stage 19, and became the winner of the 1963 Tour.

Classification leadership and minor prizes

There were several classifications in the 1963 Tour de France, two of them awarding jerseys to their leaders. The most important was the general classification, calculated by adding each cyclist's finishing times on each stage. The cyclist with the least accumulated time was the race leader, identified by the yellow jersey; the winner of this classification is considered the winner of the Tour.

Additionally, there was a points classification. In the points classification, cyclists got points for finishing among the best in a stage finish. The cyclist with the most points lead the classification, and was identified with a green jersey.

There was also a mountains classification. The organisation had categorised some climbs as either first, second, third, or fourth-category; points for this classification were won by the first cyclists that reached the top of these climbs first, with more points available for the higher-categorised climbs. The cyclist with the most points lead the classification, but was not identified with a jersey.

For the team classification, the times of the best three cyclists per team on each stage were added; the leading team was the team with the lowest total time. The riders in the team that led this classification wore yellow caps.  and the combined team IBAC-Molteni did not finish with three or more cyclists, so they were not included in the team classification.

In addition, there was a combativity award, in which a jury composed of journalists gave points after each stage to the cyclist they considered most combative. The split stages each had a combined winner. At the conclusion of the Tour, Rik Van Looy won the overall super-combativity award, also decided by journalists.

Final standings

General classification

Points classification

Mountains classification

Team classification

Aftermath
Anquetil, who had been criticized that he just a time trial specialist, showed that he was also capable of mountain stages, and everybody agreed that Anquetil was the best cyclist overall.
Anquetil was the first cyclist to win a fourth Tour de France. In the next year, he set the record sharper by winning his fifth Tour.
The French public had expected much from Raymond Poulidor, but Poulidor only made the eighth place. Normally, Poulidor was more popular than Anquetil even when Anquetil won, but this time Poulidor received "contemptuous whistles" at the finish in the Parc des Princes, while Anquetil received a standing ovation.

After Anquetil and Géminiani had shown that the rule that bicycle changes were not allowed was easily circumvented by faking a mechanical problem, this rule was removed for the next year.

Notes

References

Bibliography

External links

 
1963
1963 in French sport
1963 in road cycling
June 1963 sports events in Europe
July 1963 sports events in Europe
1963 Super Prestige Pernod